Heaven on Earth is an album by American organist Larry Young recorded in 1968 and released on the Blue Note label.

Reception
The AllMusic review by Scott Yanow awarded the album 3 stars and stated "Organist Larry Young, who really found his own sound back in 1965 with the classic Unity album, is deep in the funk on this later Blue Note album... there are some explorative solos but the less imaginative funk rhythms lower the content of the music somewhat".

Track listing
All compositions by Larry Young except as indicated
 "The Infant" - 6:00
 "The Cradle" - 5:00
 "The Hereafter" - 8:41
 "Heaven on Earth" - 6:05
 "Call Me" (Tony Hatch) - 7:26 
 "My Funny Valentine" (Lorenz Hart, Richard Rodgers) - 4:38
Recorded at Rudy Van Gelder Studio, Englewood Cliffs, New Jersey on February 9, 1968

Personnel
Larry Young - organ
Byard Lancaster - alto saxophone, flute (tracks 1 & 3–6)
Herbert Morgan - tenor saxophone (tracks 1 & 3–5)
George Benson - guitar (tracks 1 & 3–6)
Eddie Gladden - drums
Althea Young - vocals (track 6)

References

Blue Note Records albums
Larry Young (musician) albums
1968 albums
Albums recorded at Van Gelder Studio
Albums produced by Alfred Lion